Anaxidia lactea is a moth of the family Limacodidae found in Australia, including Western Australia.

External links
Limacodidae list
Anaxidia lactea at CSIRO Entomology

Limacodidae
Moths described in 1892
Moths of Australia